Glamorgan Wanderers are a Welsh rugby union club based in Ely, west Cardiff in Wales.  The club is located just to the north of Western Cemetery. They currently play in the WRU Admiral Championship.
Glamorgan Wanderers began as the Old Monktonians, formed by ex-pupils of Monkton House School in 1893. In 1913 the team changed their name to Glamorgan Wanderers to reflect the wider intake of their membership. The club played rugby on seven different grounds in the earlier years, including former Cardiff RFC ground Sophia Gardens and Llandaff RFC's pitch Bishop's Field, until they were able to purchase their present ground in 1951. The ground was purchased via various fund raising appeals and is named the Memorial Ground in honour of former players who had died in the two World Wars.

Former President of the club, and of the Welsh Rugby Union, and Deputy Lord Chief Justice, Sir Tasker Watkins, V,C., G.B.E., D.L. was awarded the Victoria Cross for his outstanding bravery in the Second World War.

Rugby Sevens
The Wanderers were an important influence on rugby sevens in Wales, having hosted the country's first seven-a-side competition in April 1939. The game of seven-a-side rugby had been played in England since 1926, but the Welsh Rugby Union had blocked any attempts for the game to be played for profit. The profits from these first games by Glamorgan Wanderers were donated to charities stipulated by the WRU.

Club honours
Snelling Sevens 1986 - Champions
Glamorgan County Silver Ball Trophy 1999-00 - Winners

Current squad

Notable former players
The following players have represented Glamorgan Wanderers and have been capped at international level.
  Lynn 'Cowboy' Davies 
  Rhys Gill
  Sam Warburton
  Lloyd Williams
  Josh Navidi
  Andy Powell
  Corey Allen
 John Yapp
  Gary Powell
  Robin Sowden-Taylor
  Ben White
  Scott Andrews

Coaches
 Head Coach Martyn Fowler
 Forwards Coach Lee Highgate
 Team Manager Ieaun Davies

Games played against international opposition

References

Sport in Cardiff
Rugby clubs established in 1893
Welsh rugby union teams
1893 establishments in Wales